The Carithers Store Building was a historic commercial building located adjacent to U.S. Route 136 on the northwest side of Village Square in Table Grove, Illinois. The two-story frame building was built in 1871; its design features Greek Revival and Italianate elements. It was added to the National Register of Historic Places in 1987 as the only surviving two-story frame commercial building in the Table Grove area. The building is no longer standing, and was removed from the National Register in 2020.

History
The building was constructed in 1871 to house a mercantile store owned by brothers William and John H. Carithers. The store was one of several new commercial buildings built in Table Grove in the 1870s, as the village experienced a period of business growth after receiving Rockford, Rock Island and St. Louis Railroad service in 1870. The two-story building, which included office space and a canopy to show goods outdoors, signified that the Carithers brothers expected their store to be successful and long-lasting enough to support such a large building. The store was profitable into the 20th century, as evidenced by John's purchase of a large home in 1897 and the store's inclusion on the Plat of Table Grove in 1912. John's son Dwight B. Carithers and the brothers' nephew William L. Hipsley took over the store in 1898; Hipsley assumed full control after John's death in 1902, as Dwight took over the Carithers family farm in John's place. Hipsley managed the store until 1922, after which time the building was used as a rented storefront, a Sunday school, and a storage area.

Architecture
The two-story wood frame store featured Greek Revival and Italianate elements in its design, reflecting a contemporary view that even functional buildings should have architectural ornaments. Broken pediments with dentillated eaves covered both gable ends of the building. Greek Revival-inspired pilasters marked three of the building's corners. The tall, narrow windows of the building had arched hoods, a typical Italianate feature.

At the time of the building's nomination to the National Register, it was the only surviving two-story frame commercial building within a  radius of Table Grove. The building was consequently considered a significant local example of its type, as similar buildings had once existed in nearby communities but had been lost to demolition and decay. However, recent photographs of the site indicate that the building is no longer standing.

References

Commercial buildings on the National Register of Historic Places in Illinois
Greek Revival architecture in Illinois
Italianate architecture in Illinois
Commercial buildings completed in 1871
Buildings and structures in Fulton County, Illinois
National Register of Historic Places in Fulton County, Illinois
Former National Register of Historic Places in Illinois